Chardafon, born Prodan Tishkov (Продан Тишков; 1860 in Gabrovo – 22 November 1906), was a Bulgarian revolutionary.  Chardafon took part in the Russo-Turkish War of 1877-78 as a volunteer. After the liberation, he became sergeant-major at East Rumelia's militia in Golyamo Konare, nowadays Saedinenie.

Until 1884, his nickname was Charda, which stands for "flock of cattle". Since a mockery in his militia work, general Von Drigalsky added "fon" (a German preposition denoting aristocratic origin) so his famous nickname appeared — Chardafon.
He took part in the preparation and proclamation of the Unification of Bulgaria. He was a member of the Bulgarian Secret Central Revolutionary Committee in Golyamo Konare and led a detachment, which entered Plovdiv on 6 November 1885 and took part in the city governor's arrest.

After the Unification of Bulgaria, he became a major at the cavalry. Zahari Stoyanov wrote a humorous outline for him, entitled Chardafon the Great.

See also 
 Unification of Bulgaria
 FC Chardafon Gabrovo
 City of Gabrovo

External links 
 Chardafon's monument in Gabrovo

1860 births
1906 deaths
People from Gabrovo
Bulgarian revolutionaries
Bulgarian people of the Russo-Turkish War (1877–1878)
19th-century Bulgarian people